NTV News is a television channel in Nepal, with a focus on news. The station began broadcasting on 18 October 2014 AD (1st Kartik 2071 BS).

See also
Nepal Television
List of Nepali television stations

References

External links
  NTV Website

Television channels in Nepal
Television news in Nepal
Television channels and stations established in 2014
2014 establishments in Nepal